Isabel Contreras (born 25 February 1989) is a Spanish canoeist. She competed in the 2020 Summer Olympics.

References

External links
 

1989 births
Living people
Spanish female canoeists
Olympic canoeists of Spain
Canoeists at the 2020 Summer Olympics
Canoeists at the 2015 European Games
Canoeists at the 2019 European Games
European Games competitors for Spain
21st-century Spanish women